Darnileh may refer to:
 Darnileh-ye Aziz
 Darnileh-ye Eskandar